Pace di Bartolo or Pace da Faenza was an Italian painter, active in Assisi in 1344-1368.

He is mentioned by Giorgio Vasari as a pupil of Giotto, and is said to have executed some decorations in fresco on the exterior of San Giovanni at Bologna. He had a particular talent for representing small figures. About the year 1574 the following works by him existed at Forlì:  The Holy Cross, a small picture in tempera, representing the Passion, and Four Scenes from the Life of the Virgin.

References
 

Year of birth unknown
Year of death unknown
14th-century Italian painters
Italian male painters